Larom Cottage is a historic cure cottage located at Saranac Lake, Franklin County, New York.  It was built between 1905 and 1910 and is a -story, wood-frame dwelling with a stone foundation and gable roof in the Queen Anne style.  It features a first-floor cure porch located in a -story addition.

It was listed on the National Register of Historic Places in 1992.

References

Houses on the National Register of Historic Places in New York (state)
Queen Anne architecture in New York (state)
Houses completed in 1905
Houses in Franklin County, New York
National Register of Historic Places in Franklin County, New York
1905 establishments in New York (state)